White Hills is a suburb of the city of Bendigo in central Victoria, Australia. It is located four kilometres immediately north-east of the city centre between North Bendigo and East Bendigo.

"The White Hills" were named for the colour of the clay exposed by gold miners at that part of the Bendigo diggings in the 1850s.

The Bendigo Creek, the site of the area's first gold find, runs through White Hills.

Facilities
White Hills Post Office opened on 21 August 1857 during the gold rush.

The Bendigo Jockey Club, a horse racing club, is based at the Bendigo racecourse in White Hills and the Bendigo Cup is run there in mid-November.

White Hills is the home of the White Hills Cricket Club; there is also a public swimming pool.

Weeroona College Bendigo, formerly known as White Hills Technical School, is a co-educational secondary college catering for students in years 7 to 10, is located in the suburb.

The Bendigo Botanic Gardens, formerly known as the White Hills Botanical Gardens, are located in the area.

Notable people
Alfred Hampson (1864–1924) Labor MLA for Bendigo East and MHR for Bendigo was born in White Hills
Thomas Flanagan (1832-1899), who found the first gold in Kalgoorlie in 1893 with his companions Paddy Hannan and Daniel Shea, is buried in the White Hills cemetery
Michael John Flannigan (1862-1901), nephew of Thomas Flanigan (above), after whom King Island's Lake Flannigan is named

References

External links
City of Greater Bendigo 
White Hills Botanical Gardens 
White Hills Public Cemetery

Gallery

Bendigo
Suburbs of Bendigo
1857 establishments in Australia
Towns in Victoria (Australia)
Mining towns in Victoria (Australia)